The Binghamton Rangers were an ice hockey team in the American Hockey League. They played in Binghamton, New York, USA at the Broome County Veterans Memorial Arena.

History
The market was previously served by:
 Broome Dusters of the NAHL (1973–1977)
 Binghamton Whalers of the American Hockey League (1980–1990)
The market was subsequently home to:
 B.C. Icemen of the UHL (1997–2002)
 Binghamton Senators of the American Hockey League (2002–2017)
 Binghamton Devils of the American Hockey League (2017–2021)
 Binghamton Black Bears of the Federal Prospects Hockey League (2021–Present)

Season-by-season results

Regular season

Playoffs

Team records

Single season
Goals: 54 Don Biggs (1992–93)
Assists: 84 Don Biggs (1992–93)
Points: 138 Don Biggs (1992–93)
Penalty minutes: 361 Peter Fiorentino (1990–91)
GAA: 2.79 Corey Hirsch (1992–93)
SV%: .904 Corey Hirsch (1992–93)

Career
Career goals: 95 Jean-Yves Roy
Career assists: 146 Craig Duncanson
Career points: 227 Craig Duncanson
Career penalty minutes: 1581 Peter Fiorentino
Career goaltending wins: 71 Corey Hirsch
Career shutouts: 3 Dan Cloutier
Career games played: 386 Peter Fiorentino

External links
 - Hockey history of the Binghamton, New York region
 The Internet Hockey Database - Binghamton Rangers

 
Ice hockey teams in New York (state)
Ice hockey clubs established in 1990
Ice hockey clubs disestablished in 1997
Former Viacom subsidiaries
1990 establishments in New York (state)
1997 disestablishments in New York (state)
Sports in Binghamton, New York